Laine Elizabeth Johnson is a politician in Ontario, Canada. She is the city councillor for College Ward on Ottawa City Council. Johnson is the first woman to represent the ward in its history.

Background
Johnson was born in Ottawa, and grew up near Hog's Back Falls. She attended Canterbury High School, specializing in drama.

Prior to being elected, Johnson was the Director of Tenant and Community Engagement the Centretown Citizens Ottawa Corporation, a non-profit housing provider. She was also the executive director of Synapcity, a non-profit that provides municipal civics education. Johnson co-founded the Ottawa Community Land Trust. She has also taught at Algonquin College, worked as a researcher for the Public Policy Forum, and was a volunteer for Ottawa Victim Services.

Johnson has a bachelor's degree in psychology and a master's degree in philanthropy and non-profit leadership, both from Carleton University.

Politics
Following the sexual harassment allegations against the outgoing councillor, Rick Chiarelli, Johnson originally planned to volunteer in the 2022 election, but was encouraged to run for council instead. Johnson was backed by the progressive Horizon Ottawa group along with politicians Diane Deans and Penny Collenette in her run for council. Johnson's campaign placed particular emphasis on affordable housing and road safety. Johnson won a majority of the vote, with her strongest support coming from Leslie Park and Westcliffe Estates.

Electoral record

|-
!rowspan="2" colspan="2"|Candidate
!colspan="3"|Popular vote
!rowspan="2" colspan="2"|Expenditures
|-
! Votes
! %
! ±%
|-
| style="background-color:#ECB421;" |
| style="text-align:left;"  | Laine Johnson
| style="text-align:right;" | 8,899
| style="text-align:right;" | 52.64
| style="text-align:right;" | –
| style="text-align:right;" |
|-
| style="background-color:#1A1D3E;" |
| style="text-align:left;"  | Pat McGarry
| style="text-align:right;" | 5,652
| style="text-align:right;" | 33.43
| style="text-align:right;" | –
| style="text-align:right;" |
|-
| style="background-color:#5DD9ED;" |
| style="text-align:left;"  | Wendy Davidson
| style="text-align:right;" | 1,338
| style="text-align:right;" | 7.91
| style="text-align:right;" | –
| style="text-align:right;" |
|-
| style="background-color:#243559;" |
| style="text-align:left;"  | Granda Kopytko
| style="text-align:right;" | 649
| style="text-align:right;" | 3.84
| style="text-align:right;" | –
| style="text-align:right;" |
|-
| style="background-color:#132F53;" |
| style="text-align:left;"  | Vilteau Delvas
| style="text-align:right;" | 368
| style="text-align:right;" | 2.18
| style="text-align:right;" | –
| style="text-align:right;" |
|-
| style="text-align:right;background-color:#FFFFFF;" colspan="2" |Total valid votes
| style="text-align:right;background-color:#FFFFFF;" | 16,906
| style="text-align:right;background-color:#FFFFFF;" | 97.54
| style="text-align:right;background-color:#c2c2c2;" colspan="2" |
|-
| style="text-align:right;background-color:#FFFFFF;" colspan="2" |Total rejected, unmarked and declined votes
| style="text-align:right;background-color:#FFFFFF;" | 427
| style="text-align:right;background-color:#FFFFFF;" | 2.46
| style="text-align:right;background-color:#c2c2c2;" colspan="2" |
|-
| style="text-align:right;background-color:#FFFFFF;" colspan="2" |Turnout
| style="text-align:right;background-color:#FFFFFF;" | 17,333
| style="text-align:right;background-color:#FFFFFF;" | 46.90
| style="text-align:right;background-color:#FFFFFF;" |
| style="text-align:right;background-color:#c2c2c2;" |
|- 
| style="text-align:right;background-color:#FFFFFF;" colspan="2" |Eligible voters
| style="text-align:right;background-color:#FFFFFF;" | 36,958
| style="text-align:right;background-color:#c2c2c2;" colspan="3" |
|- 
| style="text-align:left;" colspan="6" |Note: Candidate campaign colours are based on the prominent colour used in campaign items (signs, literature, etc.)and are used as a visual differentiation between candidates.
|- 
| style="text-align:left;" colspan="13" |Sources:
|}

References

Living people
Carleton University alumni
Ottawa city councillors
Women municipal councillors in Canada
21st-century Canadian women politicians
Year of birth missing (living people)